Jenny Lind is an unincorporated community in Sebastian County, in the U.S. state of Arkansas.

History
A post office called Jenny Lind was established in 1851, and remained in operation until it was discontinued in 1959. The community was named for Jenny Lind, a Swedish opera singer.

References

Unincorporated communities in Sebastian County, Arkansas
Unincorporated communities in Arkansas
Jenny Lind